Hockerill Anglo-European College (formerly known as Hockerill School) is an international state boarding school with academy status located in Bishop's Stortford.

In 1850, Hockerill was founded as a teacher-training college for schoolmistresses  by the first vicar of All Saints' Church, Hockerill, the Reverend John Menet. The training school was closed in 1978 and, in 1980, was reopened as Hockerill School when Fyfield School (in Essex) and Kennylands School (in Berkshire) merged. In 1995 it achieved grant-maintained status and in 1998 became known as Hockerill Anglo-European College. The school also gained Music College status. The Music College was officially opened by Lord David Puttnam on 8 October 2006. It became an academy in 2011.

Hockerill has more than 900 students, with about a third boarding. There are three types of boarding; full, weekly, and flexible. Full boarders generally live overseas, weekly boarders generally live elsewhere in the British Isles, and flexible boarders may have parents who work long hours. Hockerill also offers the International Baccalaureate (IB).

There are 5 Boarding Houses on campus,
Canterbury Boarding House - Year 7 and 8 Boys
Winchester Boarding House - Year 7-10 Girls
Durham Boarding House - Year 9 and 10 Boys
Thames Boarding House - Year 11-13 Boys
Roding Boarding House - Year 11-13 Girls

The International Baccalaureate and MYP
In 1998, Hockerill introduced the International Baccalaureate (IB) as the only form of post-16 study and accepted its first sixth form students. In 2012, 100% of Hockerill pupils passed the IB Diploma with an average points score of 36.4. The Middle Years Programme (MYP) was introduced in 2005 for years 7–9 and complements the GCSE and IGCSE taught at the college.

Equipes

Hockerill Anglo-European College has four equipes. The Equipe Colour, blue symbolises Bader Ginsburg, red symbolises Nelson Mandela, green symbolises Mary Seacole, white symbolises Alan Turing.

It was named Brunel for blue, Da Vinci for red, Goethe for green and Pascal for white before the academic year 2021-22 started.

External links

International Baccalaureate Organization website
Hockerill Anglo-European College website

Boarding schools in Hertfordshire
International Baccalaureate schools in England
Academies in Hertfordshire
Educational institutions established in 1980
1980 establishments in England
Secondary schools in Hertfordshire
Bishop's Stortford